Todd Auer is a former linebacker in the National Football League and is the Defensive Coordinator of the football team at Chadron State College.

Biography
Auer was born in Winona, Minnesota on January 18, 1965, grew up in Trempealeau and attendedGale-Ettrick-Trempealeau High School in Galesville, Wisconsin. He has four children.

Playing career
Auer played with the Green Bay Packers during the 1987 NFL season. He played at the collegiate level at Western Illinois University.  He was a first-team All American and a second-team Academic All American at WIU.

Coaching career
Auer's first coaching experience came at Western Illinois University in 1989. The next year in 1990 he joined to coaching staff at Chadron State College as the offensive line coach.  Was named Defensive Coordinator in 1994 and remained DC until 2011. In 2012 and 2013  he was the DC at Colorado Mesa University. Then moved with his family to Southern Illinois University Carbondale from 2013-2016. Now Is currently the DC at Western State Colorado University.

See also
List of Green Bay Packers players

References

People from Winona, Mississippi
People from Trempealeau, Wisconsin
Players of American football from Mississippi
Players of American football from Wisconsin
Western Illinois Leathernecks football coaches
Green Bay Packers players
American football linebackers
Western Illinois Leathernecks football players
All-American college football players
Chadron State Eagles football coaches
1965 births
Living people